The Mount Vernon Hotel Museum & Garden, formerly the Abigail Adams Smith Museum, is an historic antebellum building at 421 East 61st Street, near the East River, in New York City. It is open to the public as a museum; as of January 2023, the museum is open for tours by appointments on Mondays and Fridays.

History

One of the few remaining pre-1800 buildings in Manhattan, the house was originally planned in 1795 as an estate for Colonel William S. Smith and his wife, Abigail. The Smiths never completed the building; it was ultimately built as a carriage house and stable in 1799 for the nearby estate of William T. Robinson. Joseph Coleman Hart bought the house and converted it into a hotel in 1826.

The Mount Vernon Hotel operated in a city experiencing huge commercial growth after the opening of the Erie Canal. Its location offered guests a respite from the dirt, noise, and bustle of city life. In the 1830s, the commercial shipping and business districts of New York City lay below City Hall, while private residences extended as far north as modern-day Chelsea, and it was common for upper- and middle-class residents and visitors to take day trips to the then-rural setting that is now midtown Manhattan. One of over 50 day hotels in or near New York City, the Mount Vernon attracted middle-class guests with leisure activities such as boating trips, unusual exhibitions, reading, and making new friends. In a city without public parks or public libraries, these day hotels offered "gentlemen and their families" and other guests new ways to have fun. They could escape the explosive growth of New York City's population and the ensuing urbanization (the population of New York City, 123,706 in 1820, had grown to 202,589 by 1830) and spend a quiet day near the river, and be home downtown by sunset.

Frances Trollope and James Stuart, a Scottish diarist, are two foreign travelers who visited New York City during the time when the Mount Vernon Hotel operated under Hart. Stuart recorded his 1829 stay at the Mount Vernon Hotel in his Three Years in North America (1833):

We immediately set about obtaining a comfortable lodging-house in the neighbourhood of the city, and at length pitched our tent at Mount Vernon, about four miles from New York, on the East River or Long Island Sound, a good house in an airy situation, from the door of which a stage went to New York two or three times a-day. The house is placed upon the top of the bank, about fifty feet from the river; and the view of the river and of the gay sailing craft constantly passing, and tossed about by the eddies in every direction, is very interesting. The house in which we got rooms is kept by the stage-hirer, and is much resorted to in the afternoon by persons taking their evening ride or drive from New York; it being very much the custom to stop at such a house as this, and have a little spirits and water or lemonade. There was a course for trotting horses in an adjoining field, which tended to increase the number of people. We bargained from the beginning to have our meals in our own parlour, and had many pleasant walks for exercise in the neighbouring parts of the island of Manhattan, at times when they were free from the crowds of people who come out of the city in the evenings.

The Mount Vernon Hotel operated until 1833, when it was purchased by Jeremiah Towle, who converted it to a private residence. His daughters continued to live in the house through 1905, when the Standard Gas Light Company bought the house and erected gas tanks nearby. The house was then bought by Jane Teller Robinson in 1919. The Colonial Dames of America purchased the site in 1924 to use as its headquarters. 

In 1939, the house opened to the public as the Abigail Adams Smith Museum. The planting plan for the Abigail Adams Smith Museum gardens was by New York landscape designer Alice Recknagel Ireys and Georgian landscape designer Kate Basilashvili.

In the early 2000s , pthere was an unsuccessful attempt to rebrand the area around the museum as "Mount Vernon". At that time, the blocks immediately surrounding it were not given a specific name, and much of the former Mount Vernon estate had been demolished to make way for the Queensboro Bridge, which had opened in 1908. This area is considered part of the Upper East Side or Lenox Hill today.

Current management
The museum is currently owned and operated by the Colonial Dames of America.

Public programs
The museum tells the story of New York City's tremendous period of growth following the completion of the Erie Canal in 1825, one year before the Mount Vernon Hotel opened. Tours, public programs, and other educational programs are offered. The museum is open to the public 11 am to 4 pm Tuesday through Sunday for interpreter-led tours of the period rooms and garden. The museum provides school field trips and hosts an average of 35 programs throughout the year, including monthly Lunchtime Lectures, Children's Storytime, summer concerts, and History Weeks for school-aged children. Annual events include the George Washington's Birthday Ball, Halloween Murder Mystery, and Candlelight Holiday Tours.

Ongoing research
Each summer, Hearst Fellows conduct original research on aspects of New York history and daily life, including trade, travel, leisure, education, urban development, popular music, and gender and race relationships of the 1820s-30s.

See also
 List of New York City Designated Landmarks in Manhattan from 59th to 110th Streets
 National Register of Historic Places listings in Manhattan from 59th to 110th Streets

References

External links

Museum Listing on ny.com

1799 establishments in New York (state)
1826 establishments in New York (state)
1939 establishments in New York City
Colonial Dames of America
Commercial buildings completed in 1799
Historic house museums in New York City
History of women in New York City
Hotels established in 1826
Hotels in Manhattan
Houses in Manhattan
Museums established in 1939
Museums in Manhattan
New York City Designated Landmarks in Manhattan
Residential buildings in Manhattan
Upper East Side
Women in New York City